Charles Battell Loomis (1861–1911) was an American author.

Biography
Loomis was born in Brooklyn, New York, and educated at the Polytechnic Institute there.  He was in business from 1879 to 1891, but he gave it up to devote himself to the writing of magazine sketches and books much appreciated for their humor.

Works 
 Just Rhymes (1899)
 The Four-Masted Cat-Boat (1899)
 Yankee Enchantments (1900)
 A Partnership in Magic (1903)
 Cheerful Americans (1903)
 Araminta and the Automobile (1903)
 More Cheerful Americans (1904)
 I've Been Thinking (1905)
 Minerva's Manœuvres (1905)
 Cheer Up! (1906)
 A Bath in an English Tub (1907)
 Poe's "Raven" in an Elevator (1907) (the third edition of More Cheerful Americans)
 The Knack of It (1908)
 A Holiday Touch (1908)
 Just Irish (1909)

References

External links

 
 
 
 Over 35 Charles Battell Loomis stories are read in Mister Ron's Basement Podcast, including "Araminta and the Automobile" and "Poe's Raven in an Elevator". The stories are now indexed.
 

American humorists
American male writers
People from Brooklyn
1861 births
1911 deaths
Polytechnic Institute of New York University alumni